Yarrow Valley Park is a country park in Lancashire, England.
It follows the River Yarrow for about 6 miles.  It contains much woodland and includes nature reserves, best known being Birkacre and Duxbury Woods.  Parts of the park are reclaimed collieries and other old industrial sites.

A visitor's centre is on site, with regular conservation events.  Angling is permitted on the two lodges.

The park provides recreation for the nearby town of Chorley and its surrounding villages.

External links 
 BBC Photo Gallery
 Chorley Borough Council page

Parks and commons in Chorley
Country parks in Lancashire